"Love in the Key of C" is a 1996 single by American singer Belinda Carlisle. The song was the third release from her album, A Woman and a Man and reached number #20 in the UK Singles Chart becoming her 10th Top 20 hit there.  It was written by her regular songwriter, Rick Nowels and produced by David Tickle. This remains Carlisle's final UK top 20 hit as of 2023.

Music video
The video for the single was directed by Philippe Gautier and featured Shelley Preston, who was working as a backing singer for Carlisle at the time.

Track listing

CD 1
"Love in the Key of C"
"Kneel at Your Feet"
"In Too Deep (Live acoustic version)
"Circle in the Sand (Live acoustic version)

CD 2
"Love in the Key of C"
"Too Much Water" (Demo version) (Charlotte Caffey, Tom Caffey, Belinda Carlisle)
"Watcha Doin' to Me" (Demo version) (Charlotte Caffey, Tom Caffey, Belinda Carlisle)
"Don't Cry" (Demo version) (Charlotte Caffey, Tom Caffey, Belinda Carlisle)

Charts

References

1996 singles
Belinda Carlisle songs
Songs written by Rick Nowels
Chrysalis Records singles
1996 songs